The anime series Red Garden first aired on TV Tokyo in Japan on October 3, 2006 with the episode "Farewell, Girls", and concluded 22 episodes later with "Light" on March 13, 2007. The first DVD was released in September 2007.

Episode listing

References

Episodes
Red Garden